{{DISPLAYTITLE:C17H22O2}}
The molecular formula C17H22O2 (molar mass: 258.35 g/mol, exact mass: 258.1620 u) may refer to:

 Cicutoxin
 Oenanthotoxin
 O-1602

Molecular formulas